Gârdeşti may refer to several villages in Romania:

 Gârdeşti, a village in Necșești Commune, Teleorman County
 Gârdeşti, a village in Voineşti Commune, Vaslui County

See also 
 Gârda (disambiguation)